Chyornoye Ozero (Qarakül) is a rural locality (a village) in Yevbulyaksky Selsoviet, Askinsky District, Bashkortostan, Russia. The population was 36 as of 2010. There is 1 street.

Geography 
Chyornoye Ozero is located 15 km southwest of Askino (the district's administrative centre) by road. Kushkul is the nearest rural locality.

References 

Rural localities in Askinsky District